Sahbaz Khan Donboli was the first khan of the Khoy Khanate from 1747 to 1763

References

People from Khoy
Khoy Khanate
1699 births
1767 deaths
Donboli tribe